Cambridge Park Cranebrook Junior Rugby League Football Club is an Australian rugby league football club based in Cambridge Park, New South Wales formed in 1968.

Notable players 

Des Hasler
Rodney Whiticker
Steve Robinson
Stephen Burns
Jamie Olejnik
Vince Carr
Greg Alexander
Mark Lyons
John Cartwright
Ben Alexander
Troy Wozniak
Darrien Doherty
Carl MacNamara
Brad Fittler
Nathan Barnes
Glen Liddiard
Matt Geyer
Chris Williams
Trent Waterhouse
Steve Turner
Ben Pomeroy
Junior Moors
Keith Peters
Justin Horo
Matthew Wright
Tyrone May

See also

List of rugby league clubs in Australia
Rugby league in New South Wales

References

External links
Cambridge Park Cranebrook JRLFC Official Site

Rugby league teams in Sydney
Rugby league teams in New South Wales
Rugby clubs established in 1968
1968 establishments in Australia